Camphoric acid, C10H16O4 or in Latin form Acidum camphoricum, is a white crystallisable substance obtained from the oxidation of camphor. It exists in three optically different forms; the dextrorotatory one is obtained by the oxidation of dextrorotatory camphor and is used in pharmaceuticals.

History
Acidum camphoricum was studied and isolated for the first time by French pharmacist Nicolas Vauquelin in the early 19th century but it wasn't until September 1874 that Dutch chemist Jacobus H. van 't Hoff proposed the first suggestion for its molecular structure and optical properties. Haller and Blanc synthesized camphor from camphoric acid.  In 1904, Finnish chemist Gustav Komppa became the first to succeed in manufacturing synthetic camphoric acid from diethyl oxalate and 3,3-dimethylpentanoic acid, and thus proving the structure of camphor.

Chemical properties and isolation
Camphoric acid may be prepared by oxidising camphor with nitric acid.

References

Dicarboxylic acids
Antiseptics
Cyclopentanes